Captive was a New Zealand reality TV show that was broadcast on TV2 at 7 pm on week nights, the timeslot usually occupied by Shortland Street, in early 2004.

Format 
The show put five strangers together in an apartment and forced them to perform challenges, with one house-mate replaced every week.

The contestants were captive in a complex for the duration of their time on the show. They competed for prize money of nearly forty thousand New Zealand dollars by answering pop culture questions. If they correctly answered the question, they stole money from other captives. If they answer wrongly, they lost money. Whoever had the most money after a round was given the option to leave captivity or to take their winnings. However, the person who had the lowest sum of money after the final round had to leave empty-handed.

Contestants 
Liz Shaw appeared on Captive for one episode.  She would later go on to feature on New Zealand Idol as the "anti Idol" in 2005.

References 

New Zealand reality television series
2004 New Zealand television series debuts
Quiz shows
Television game shows with incorrect disambiguation